The 2018–2019 Mongolian protests was a series of mass demonstrations and popular protests against the president and the government after a leak which showed scandals and links of embezzlement with parliament speaker and corruption scandals also unleashed. This triggered the popular uprising and plunged the country into the 2019 Mongolian constitutional crisis.

Background
Corruption has been tranquil in the country, since mass demonstrations against the results of 2017 Mongolian presidential election. In a 2016 corruption case, many government officials, along with loyal policemen and security forces were found guilty of embezzlement and fraud.

Protests
The rallies erupted in September, with serene anger over the government and president. Anti-scandal and anti-corruption demonstrations soon turned into anti-government and worker demonstrations and rallies by journalists and pensioners, students and workers and continued strongly throughout the month of October. In September, the first traces of public anger was put into place as small demonstrations broke out. These demonstrations turned into an uprising demanding for justice and elections.

Further protests
In February, the daily protests turned violent, but the danger soon diminished. The unrest was witnessed by hundreds of thousands of others in Ulaanbaatar. The democratic reforms movement was dwindling while the 2019 Mongolian constitutional crisis was taking place. In April and May 2019, a series of votes was held for a new speaker in parliament.

See also
 2008 riot in Mongolia
 Mongolian Revolution of 1990

References

2018 in Mongolia
2019 in Mongolia
Politics of Mongolia